Trinity School is a coeducational Christian secondary school and sixth form based in Sevenoaks, Kent, England. The school opened in September 2013 under the Free School initiative set forward by the coalition government. The current enrolment is more than 850 pupils. The first headmaster was co-founder Matthew Tate and the current being Dr. Matthew Pawson who has led the school since September 2016.

The school is based at the Wildernesse School site and was rated as a Good School by Ofsted in the 2015 report.

References

External links
 Official website

Schools in Sevenoaks
2013 establishments in England
Secondary schools in Kent
Christian schools in England
Free schools in England